The Succulent Karoo is a ecoregion defined by the World Wide Fund for Nature to include regions of desert in South Africa and Namibia, and a biodiversity hotspot. The geographic area chosen by the WWF for what they call 'Succulent Karoo' does not correspond to the actual Karoo.

Geography
The Succulent Karoo stretches along the coastal strip of southwestern Namibia and South Africa's Northern Cape Province, where the cold Benguela Current offshore creates frequent fogs. The ecoregion extends inland into the uplands of South Africa's Western Cape Province. It is bounded on the south by the Mediterranean climate fynbos, on the east by the Nama Karoo, which has more extreme temperatures and variable rainfall, and on the north by the Namib Desert.

Flora
The Succulent Karoo is notable for the world's richest flora of succulent plants, and harbours about one-third of the world’s approximately 10,000 succulent species. 40% of its succulent plants are endemic. The region is extraordinarily rich in geophytes, harbouring approximately 630 species.

Fauna
The ecoregion is a centre of diversity and endemism for reptiles and many invertebrates. Of the ecoregion’s 50 scorpion species, 22 are endemic. Monkey beetles, largely endemic to southern Africa, are concentrated in the Succulent Karoo and are important pollinators of the flora. So, too, are the Hymenoptera and masarine wasps, and colletid, fideliid, and melittid bees. 

Approximately 15 amphibians are found in this ecoregion, including three endemics; among the region’s 115 reptile species, 48 are endemic and 15 are strict endemics. The Sperrgebiet region is a hotspot for an unusual tortoise, the Nama padloper. Endemism is present, but less pronounced, among the Succulent Karoo’s bird and mammal populations.

Conservation
The ecoregion has been designated a biodiversity hotspot by Conservation International.

External links
 
 Succulent Karoo biodiversity hotspot (Conservation International)
 Succulent Karoo (PlantZAfrica.com)

References

 

Afrotropical ecoregions
Deserts and xeric shrublands
Ecoregions of Namibia
Ecoregions of South Africa